Palca or Pallqa (Aymara) is the first municipal section of the Pedro Domingo Murillo Province in the  La Paz Department, Bolivia. Its seat is Palca.

Geography 
The Cordillera Real traverses the municipality. Some of the highest peaks of the municipality are listed below:

Population 
The people are predominantly indigenous citizens of Aymara descent.

Places of interest 
Some of the tourist attractions of the municipality are:
 Apacheta viewpoint in Palca Canton which offers a sight of the contrasting landscape and snowcapped Illimani
 Valle de los Ánimas ("Valley of the Souls") and its lake (Laguna de las Ánimas) in Palca Canton
 the town of Palca with houses of colonial times, Palca River, Chuaqueri gorge, also known as Palca gorge, and Takesi pre-Columbian trail in Palca Canton
 the communities of Quilihuaya and Pinaya in Quilihuaya Canton
 the community of Cohoni, its church dating from the 17th century and the chullpas of Ch'ullu Cahinbaya in Cohoni Canton

See also 
 Ch'uxña Quta
 Cohoni

References

External links 
 Palca Municipality: population data and map (PDF; 534 kB)

Municipalities of La Paz Department (Bolivia)